Mstislav Rostislavich (? – 1180), known as "The Brave", was Prince of Smolensk and Prince of Novgorod.

Mstislav was the fourth of five sons (and the eighth of nine children) of Rostislav Mstislavich, who was briefly Grand Prince of Kiev in 1167.  Mstislav himself married twice; his first wife was a daughter of Iaroslav Iziaslavich of Volynia (and later Grand Prince of Kiev), while his second wife, whom he married sometime before 1176, was a daughter of Gleb Rostislavich of Riazan.

Mstislav was Prince of Belgorod in 1161 and again from 1171 to 1173, Prince of Toropets since 1167, and Prince of Smolensk from 1175 to 1177.  In 1168, he was one of thirteen princes of Rus' who, under Grand Prince Mstislav Iziaslavich, defeated the Polovtsy in a major battle on the steppe.  The following year, he and his brother Roman along with the son of Andrey Bogolyubsky, besieged Novgorod the Great but Bogolyubsky's army was defeated in battle.  In 1171, Mstislav and his brothers helped place their uncle, Vladimir Mstislavich of Dorogobuzh, on the Kievan throne, although he was soon deposed.  In 1172 and 1173, Mstislav also helped his brothers, Roman Rostislavich and then Rurik, take the throne in Kiev (indeed, Riurik sat on the Kievan throne seven times).  In 1174, Andrey Bogolyubsky sent an ambassador to Kiev to demand that the Rostislavichi leave the city and return it to Andrey's branch of the family.  In reply, Mstislav shaved the head and beard of an envoy and sent him back to Andrey, an act which was not only a sign of disrespect, but may also be seen as a forcible tonsure of the man.  It was also in violation of the law as the Russkaya Pravda set a fine of 12 grivnas for shaving a man's beard.  For this offense, Andrey attacked Mstislav and besieged him in the town of Vyshgorod for nine weeks but was unable to take him or the city.

In 1179, Mstislav was elected prince of Novgorod (his older brothers, Roman, Sviatoslav, and David had also been chosen princes of Novgorod) and entered the city on 1 November 1179.  He led the Novgorodians against the Chud (Finnic tribes in modern-day Russia or Estonia) during the winter of 1179–1180, but fell ill the following spring and died on 14 June 1180. He was buried following a divine liturgy presided over by Archbishop Ilya of Novgorod, the hegumens of the Novgorodian monasteries, and the Novgorodian clergy; his remains now lie in a gypsum sarcophagus along the south wall of the Chapel of the Nativity of the Mother of God in the Cathedral of Holy Wisdom in Novgorod the Great across the chapel from Bishop St. Nikita.  (Mstislav Rostislavich of Rostov is buried in the crypt below the cathedral.)

The Hypatian (Ipatevskaia) Chronicle called Mstislav the "Jewel" (украшение) of the Russian princes, saying that he warred only for glory, despised gold and silver, gave all his booty to the church and was universally loved.

Mstislav's son, Mstislav Mstislavich Udaloy (The Daring), born by his first wife, was one of the most important princes of Rus' in the decades before the Mongol Invasion, and one of the few to escape from the Battle of Kalka River alive.  Mstislav Rostislavich also had two sons by his second wife: Vladimir and David.

In literature, Mstislav is addressed by the narrator in The Tale of Igor's Campaign along with his brother Roman, when the narrator calls on the great princes of Rus to band together to fight the nomadic invaders.  Mstislav, however, had been dead six years before Igor's campaign took place, so the call to arms would have gone unheeded.  Mstislav's brothers, Riurik and David are also addressed in an earlier stanza of the poem.

Mstislav is, as Georgii (his baptismal name) a canonized saint of the Russian Orthodox Church.  His feast day is 14 OS/27 June NS.  His remains were uncovered in 1634 and found to be incorrupt.

References

1140s births
1180 deaths
Rostislavichi family (Smolensk)
Rurik dynasty
Princes of Belgrod
Princes of Smolensk
Princes of Novgorod
12th-century princes in Kievan Rus'
Eastern Orthodox monarchs